Kwebanna is an Amerindian village in Barima-Waini region, in the north of Guyana. Kwebanna is connected by road to Kumaka, Barima-Waini.

Economy
In the 1990s, logging companies began exploiting timber in the area. The area is a producer of cabbage and sweet cassava. In December 2018, construction began of a $26 million cassava flour processing factory in the village. The Ministry of Social Protection's Co-operative Society Department overlooked the establishment of the Kwebanna Farmers’ Co-operative in the village.

References

Populated places in Barima-Waini
Indigenous villages in Guyana